Review of Policy Research is a bimonthly peer-reviewed academic journal published by Wiley-Blackwell on behalf of the Policy Studies Organization. The journal was established in 1981. The current editors-in-chief are Nita Farahany, Ken Rogerson, and Tim Profeta, professors of law, public policy, and environmental policy at Duke University. The journal focuses on the politics and policy of science, technology and the environment, including science policy, environmental policy, climate change, artificial intelligence, data and technology, information networks, biotechnology, and research and innovation.  The journal is the official journal of the Science, Technology and Environmental Politics section of the American Political Science Association.

According to the Journal Citation Reports, the journal has a 2017 impact factor of 1.25, ranking it 78th out of 169 journals in the category "Political Science" and 30th out of 47 journals in the category "Public Administration".

See also 
 List of political science journals
 List of public administration journals

References

External links 
 

Wiley-Blackwell academic journals
English-language journals
Publications established in 1981
Political science journals
Bimonthly journals